Theodore Roosevelt Inaugural National Historic Site preserves the Ansley Wilcox House, at 641 Delaware Avenue in Buffalo, New York.  Here, after the assassination of William McKinley, Theodore Roosevelt took the oath of office as President of the United States on September 14, 1901.  A New York historical marker outside the house indicates that it was the site of Theodore Roosevelt's Inauguration.

Property history

The oldest part of the National Historic Site includes the lone surviving structure from the Buffalo Barracks compound.  Due to tensions between the U.S. and Anglo-Canada, a military post was constructed to ensure border security.  Built in 1839, the post encompassed all the land from Allen Street to North Street and Delaware Ave to Main Street.  The structure that would later be incorporated into the Theodore Roosevelt Inaugural National Historic Site started life in 1840 as the Barracks' officers' quarters.

After the post was disbanded in 1845, the home reverted to a private residence.  Subsequent owners continued to modify the structure adding and demolishing out structures and additions.  In the late 19th century, Dexter Rumsey gave the property to his son-in-law Ansley Wilcox and his wife Mary Grace Rumsey.  The newest inhabitants made extensive renovations to the structure.  Plans of these renovations are still on file at the Historic Site.

Inauguration of Theodore Roosevelt

In 1901, while attending the Pan-American Exposition, President William McKinley was shot twice at close range by anarchist Leon Czolgosz. 

Although early doctor's reports on the President's condition were positive, McKinley's condition soon worsened: while Vice President Theodore Roosevelt rushed back to Buffalo, he was informed on arrival that McKinley had died.

It was decided to conduct the inauguration immediately, due to the tragic and politically charged circumstances of President McKinley's death. The most appropriate site was determined to be the Wilcox home. Approximately 50 dignitaries, family members and cabinet officials gathered in the front library for the inauguration, while Federal Judge John R. Hazel administered the oath. No photographic image exists of the ceremony itself, although the room was heavily photographed after the inauguration had concluded.

Later history
The Wilcoxes continued to live in the home until their deaths in the 1930s.  The home's furniture was sold at a public auction and the property became the Kathryn Lawrence Restaurant.  The proprietors removed interior walls, demolished a carriage house, and painted many of the finished wood surfaces before the restaurant ceased operations in 1961.

Museum
The first part of the house is a museum displaying many items from the 1901 Pan-American Exposition, including wine glasses, plates, playing cards, and the key to the Temple of Music.  The last room is a recreation of the office Roosevelt used during his presidency, and includes an interactive desk which can be used to send e-mails to yourself.

Administrative history
The National Historic Site was authorized on November 2, 1966.  As an historic area administered by the National Park Service, it was automatically listed on the National Register of Historic Places the same day.

See also
 Presidential memorials in the United States

References

External links

Theodore Roosevelt Inaugural Site Foundation
Kasparian, Lance. Historic Structure Report: Theodore Roosevelt Inaugural Site. Washington, D.C.: National Park Service, 2006. Accessed 7 December 2008.
Hurst, Richard M.  The Wilcox House.  Buffalo, NY: Buffalo and Erie County Historical Society, Adventures in Western New York History, volume XIX (downloadable from http://bechsed.nylearns.org/, click on Adventures in WNY History)
Theodore Roosevelt Inaugural Site: Birthplace of the Modern Presidency, a National Park Service Teaching with Historic Places (TwHP) lesson plan

Historic American Buildings Survey in New York (state)
Roosevelt, Theodore Inaugural
National Historic Sites in New York (state)
Theodore Roosevelt
Historic house museums in New York (state)
Protected areas established in 1966
Presidential museums in New York (state)
Museums in Buffalo, New York
Houses in Buffalo, New York
Houses in Erie County, New York
1966 establishments in New York (state)
Houses completed in 1840
Assassination of William McKinley
National Register of Historic Places in Buffalo, New York